Symphony No.1 is A three movement piece for Orchestra and Turntables by Jeremy Mayall.  This piece is the first orchestral symphony to use the techniques of turntablism.

History 
The conception for this piece started in 2003 when composer Jeremy Mayall first wanted to blend the worlds of classical orchestral music with modern Hip Hop turntablism.
He began work on creating a structure for the piece, as well as deciding how best to score and integrate the turntable parts into the well established orchestral traditions.
The piece was finished in early 2004. It was played as part of orchestral readings events by the APO and NZSO but didn't receive its premiere performance until May 2005. The premiere performance was given by the Wellington Youth Orchestra at the Michael Fowler Centre, in Wellington, New Zealand. Mayall performed the turntable part.

Instrumentation 

Piccolo
2 Flutes
2 Oboes
Cor Anglais
2 Clarinets (Bb)
Bass Clarinet
2 Bassoons
Contrabassoon
4 Horns (F)
3 Trumpets (C)
2 Trombones
Bass Trombone
Tuba
Timpani
Percussion:-
Mvt1: (Bass Drum, 5 RotoToms, Tam-Tam, 3 Tomtoms, Triangle)
Mvt2: (Suspended Cymbal, Tam-Tam, Triangle, Tubular Bells, Glockenspiel)
Mvt3: (Bass Drum, 5 RotoToms, Snare Drum, Tam-Tam, 3 Tomtoms, Woodblock)
Turntables
Strings

Duration:	
Mvt1: c. 6’30”
Mvt2: c. 5’00”
Mvt3: c. 4’20”

<Sounz=http://sounz.org.nz/works/show/15020/>

21st-century symphonies